Giacomo Matteo Furia (2 January 1925 – 5 June 2015) was an Italian film, television and stage actor. He appeared in more than 130 films between 1948 and 1998.

Life and career

Born in Arienzo, near Caserta, Furia started his acting career thanks to Eduardo De Filippo, he had met through an after-school summer job; he made his professional debut on stage in 1945, in De Filippo's "Napoli milionaria". He made his film debut three years later, in Mario Mattoli's Assunta Spina; mainly cast in character roles, he was often a sidekick of Totò, notably landing a major role in The Band of Honest Men. His credits include films directed by Federico Fellini, Vittorio De Sica, Roberto Rossellini and Francesco Rosi. In 1997 Furia released an autobiography written in collaboration with Michele Avitabile, Le maggiorate, il principe e l'ultimo degli onesti. He died on 5 June 2015, aged 90.

Selected filmography

 Assunta Spina (1948) - Tittariello
 The Bride Can't Wait (1949) - Giovanni
 Toto Looks for a House (1949) - Pasquale Saluto
 Little Lady (1949) - Il meccanico napoletano
 Snow White and the Seven Thieves (1949)
 L'inafferrabile 12 (1950) - Il maresciallo
 Totò Tarzan (1950) - The Cook
 Toto the Sheik (1950) - Un legionario
 Variety Lights (1950) - Duke
 Arrivano i nostri (1951) - L'automobilista
 O.K. Nerone (1951) - Harbinger
 Il microfono è vostro (1951) - Guardia notturna
 The Dream of Zorro (1952) - Panchito
 The Machine to Kill Bad People (1952) - Romano Cuccurullo
 Good Folk's Sunday (1953) - Passante allo stadio (uncredited)
 Neapolitan Turk (1953) - Prison guard (uncredited)
 Two Nights with Cleopatra (1954) - Mercante (uncredited)
 A Slice of Life (1954) - (segment "Don Corradino")
 Modern Virgin (1954) - Un commesso
 The Cheerful Squadron (1954) - The Corporal
 The Doctor of the Mad (1954) - Michele
 Prima di sera (1954) - Alberto Belli - the chemist
 The Gold of Naples (1954) - Rosario - marito di Sofia (segment "Pizze a credito")
 Tears of Love (1954)
 Tragic Ballad (1954) - Vigile urbano
 Too Bad She's Bad (1954) - Luigi
 The Art of Getting Along (1955) - Maggiordomo di Sasà
 Toto in Hell (1955)
 Le avventure di Giacomo Casanova (1955)
 Suonno d'ammore (1955)
 Are We Men or Corporals? (1955)
 La rossa (1955) - Giacomo
 The Two Friends (1955) - Vincenzo, il sarto
 L'ultimo amante (1955) - Il nuovo inquilino
 Destination Piovarolo (1955) - Il segretario de De Fassi
 The Best Part (1955) - Le gérant de la cantine
 Una sera di maggio (1955)
 The Band of Honest Men (1956) - Cardone
 I giorni più belli (1956) - L'addetto al trenino del Luna Park
 Peccato di castità (1956)
 Saranno uomini (1956)
 Susanna Whipped Cream (1957)
 Marisa (1957)
 Primo applauso (1957)
 Peppino, le modelle e chella là (1957) - Giacomino
 Onore e sangue (1957) - Gegè - Arturo's friend
 A sud niente di nuovo (1957)
 Amore a prima vista (1958) - Clemente
 È arrivata la parigina (1958) - Vincenzino
 Adorable and a Liar (1958) - Primo Fiorenzi
 Toto, Peppino and the Fanatics (1958) - Man Cousin of Giovanni
 Angel in a Taxi (1958) - Pasticciere
 Toto in the Moon (1958) - Il Commedator Santoni
 Non sono più Guaglione (1958) - Don Salvatore - the shoemaker
 Arriva la banda (1959)
 Toto in Madrid (1959) - Tobia
 Venetian Honeymoon (1959) - Stanislas dit Stan
 Pensione Edelweiss (1959) - Le ténor
 Prepotenti più di prima (1959) - Il dottore
 My Wife's Enemy (1959) - Peppino
 Lui, lei e il nonno (1959)
 The Thieves (1959) - Vincenzo Scognamiglio
 Ragazzi del Juke-Box (1959) - Gennarino
 La cambiale (1959) - The Clerk to the Court (uncredited)
 Ferdinando I, re di Napoli (1959) - Ciccillo
 Spavaldi e innamorati (1959)
 Guardatele ma non toccatele (1959) - Edoardo Capuano
 Avventura in città (1959)
 Howlers in the Dock (1960) - L'onorevole Gubellini
 Il carro armato dell'8 settembre (1960)
 Sweet Deceptions (1960) - Negoziante
 Il corazziere (1960) - Macchione
 Sanremo - La grande sfida (1960)
 I Teddy boys della canzone (1960) - Funzionario RAI
 Akiko (1961) - Peppe
 Come September (1961) - Poliziotto (uncredited)
 The Last Judgment (1961)
 Black City (1961) - Il ministro Califano
 Ursus in the Valley of the Lions (1961) - Simud
 Che femmina!! E... che dollari! (1961)
 Pugni, pupe e marinai (1961) - RAI Porter
 Boccaccio '70 (1962) - Worker (segment "Le tentazioni del dottor Antonio") (uncredited)
 Colpo gobbo all'italiana (1962) - Brigadier
 La leggenda di Fra Diavolo (1962)
 Lo sgarro (1962)
 Uno strano tipo (1963) - Direttore dell'hotel
 The Monk of Monza (1963) - Cecco, un bravo
 I terribili 7 (1963) - Appaltatore
 Toto vs. the Black Pirate (1964) - Don Carlos d'Aragona
 L'ultima carica (1964)
 Devil of the Desert Against the Son of Hercules (1964) - Salene
 Backfire (1964) - Nino (uncredited)
 La traite des blanches (1965)
 La donnaccia (1965)
 La vedovella (1965) - Gennarino
 Te lo leggo negli occhi (1965) - Tino
 Non son degno di te (1965) - Sergeant Gargiulo
 Baraka (1966)
 Monnaie de singe (1966)
 That Man George (1966)
 Sharp-Shooting Twin Sisters (1966)
 Maigret and His Greatest Case (1966) - Marcello Genaro
 More Than a Miracle (1967)
 Fantabulous Inc. (1967)
 Vacanze sulla Costa Smeralda (1968) - Accountant
 Zum Zum Zum - La canzone che mi passa per la testa (1969) - Pasquale
 Il ragazzo che sorride (1969) - Barman
 Isabella, duchessa dei diavoli (1969) - Rudolph
 And God Said to Cain (1970) - Juanito
 Mr. Superinvisible (1970)
 La ragazza del prete (1970) - Il sacrestano
 L'interrogatorio (1970)
 Io non spezzo... rompo (1971) - Policeman from Naples
 Il furto è l'anima del commercio!?... (1971) - Commissario Mammone
 Boccaccio (1972)
 Tutti fratelli nel West… per parte di padre (1972)
 Sans sommation (1973) - Le commissaire
 My Pleasure Is Your Pleasure (1973) - Il vescovo di Coira
 Special Killers (1973) - Bartender
 Provaci anche tu Lionel (1973)
 Adolescence pervertie (1974)
 Commissariato di notturna (1974, also screenwriter) - Il brigadiere Santini
 La cameriera (1974) - Il medico
 The Balloon Vendor (1974) - Male Nurse
 Substitute Teacher (1975) - Il preside
 The Adolescent (1976) - Il notaio
 Il comune senso del pudore (1976) - Lattanzi / Direttore di produzione del film Lady Chatterley / Production director of the film Lady Chatterley
 La linea del fiume (1976) - Il medico
 Death Rage (1976) - Brigadiere Cannavale
 La compagna di banco (1977) - Commissario Acavallo
 L'amour chez les poids lourds (1978)
 The Payoff (1978) - Antonio
 Pugni, dollari e spinaci (1978) - Stilo's Lawyer
 Bactron 317 ou L'espionne qui venait du show (1979)
 Il lupo e l'agnello (1980)
 La settimana bianca (1980) - Pasquarelli
 Lulù 77 (1980)
 L'onorevole con l'amante sotto il letto (1981) - Zio Efisio
 Crime at the Chinese Restaurant (1981) - judge Enrico Arducci
 Vediamoci chiaro (1984) - Peppino
 C'è posto per tutti (1990) - Caposquadra Disoccupati
 Ci hai rotto papà (1993)
 Senza amore (2007) - Il Prete
 No Problem (2008) - Galeazzo

References

External links

1925 births
2015 deaths
Italian male film actors
20th-century Italian male actors
Italian male stage actors
Italian male television actors
People from the Province of Caserta